William Curley (born 20 November 1945) is an English former footballer who made 29 appearances in the Football League playing as a full back for Darlington in the 1960s. He played for Durham Schools' under-15 team in the 1960–61 season, and was the first player to be taken on by Darlington as an apprentice professional under the scheme introduced in 1960.

References

1945 births
Living people
People from Trimdon
Footballers from County Durham
English footballers
Association football defenders
Darlington F.C. players
English Football League players